Terminalia bursarina, commonly known as bendee, is a tree of the family Combretaceae native to northern parts of Australia.

It blooms between June and September producing white-yellow flowers. The species is very similar to Terminalia canescens but has smaller leaves and fruits.

It is in rock crevices and in river beds in the Kimberley region of Western Australia and the Northern Territory growing in sandy-stony soils over sandstone.

References

Trees of Australia
Flora of Western Australia
Flora of the Northern Territory
Plants described in 1861
bursarina
Taxa named by Ferdinand von Mueller